Reputasyon (lit. Reputation) is a Philippine romance drama previously aired by ABS-CBN. It stars Cristine Reyes together with Rayver Cruz and Jason Abalos. It also stars the daytime television comeback of Aiko Melendez and Jaclyn Jose. It originally aired on the 2:00 – 2:45 p.m. timeslot, until September 19, 2011 when it was moved to the 5:00 – 5:45 p.m. timeslot as requested by the televiewers. The show was aired from July 11, 2011 to January 20, 2012.

List of episodes

References

Lists of Philippine drama television series episodes